Sir Peter Maudslay Hordern, DL, PC (born 18 April 1929) is a British Conservative Party politician.

Early life
Hordern was born on 18 April 1929 and was the son of Captain Charles Hubert Hordern MBE and grandson of Rt. Rev. Hugh Maudslay Hordern (Bishop of Lewes). He was educated at Geelong Grammar School, Australia and Christ Church, Oxford. He served with the 60th Rifles from 1947 to 1949, joining the regiment of his father and great-uncle, Brig. General Gwyn Venables Hordern CB, CMG, JP. He then became a Member of the Stock Exchange.

Political career
Hordern served as Member of Parliament for Horsham from 1964 to 1974, for Horsham and Crawley from 1974 to 1983 and for Horsham once again from 1983 to 1997. He was appointed to the Privy Council of the United Kingdom in 1993. He was appointed a Deputy Lieutenant for West Sussex. He was a member of the Public Accounts Committee from 1970 to 1987, Chairman of the Finance Committee from 1970 to 1972 and Chairman of the Public Accounts Commission from 1988 to 1997. He was appointed to the Executive of the 1922 Committee in 1967, later becoming Secretary of the 1922 Committee and Chairman of the Conservative backbench Committee on Europe.

Colin Welch described him as "the ablest Tory never to have been a minister". Andrew Roth's Parliamentary Profiles (1987–1991) describes him as "Widely respected, well-connected, principled Rightwing, monetarist City gent; a hard-headed long term thinker; a devout believer in sanctity of tight money" and as saying "I was not only one of the first in this House to be a monetarist...I confidently expect to be about the last." Ahead of the high inflation of the mid-1970s, he attacked (with some prescience) the Bank of England in 1970 for insufficient monetary restraint and (while Chairman of the Finance Committee) both publicly opposed Chancellor Anthony Barber's over-expansion of monetary supply in April 1971 and attacked the Heath Government's "absurd" proposals for a statutory prices and incomes policy.

Other work
He was appointed a Director of Petrofina UK PLC in 1973 and Chairman in 1987. He was appointed a Director of F&C Smaller Companies Investment Trust, plc in 1978, and as Chairman in 1986. He was appointed as a Director of TR Technology Investment Trust in 1985 (formerly Atlas Electric and General Trust). In 1982 he was appointed a Consultant to Fisons PLC and a Consultant to House of Fraser PLC and Pannell Kerr Forster in 1984.

Personal life
Hordern married Elizabeth Susan Chataway (sister of Sir Christopher Chataway) in 1964. They have two sons and one daughter: Andrew Charles Hugh Hordern (b. 5 July 1965, d. 25 November 2009); James Peter Hordern (b. 8 September 1967); and Sara Victoria Margaret (b. 19 March 1971).

References

External links
 

1929 births
Conservative Party (UK) MPs for English constituencies
Members of the Privy Council of the United Kingdom
Knights Bachelor
King's Royal Rifle Corps officers
Living people
People educated at Geelong Grammar School
Alumni of Christ Church, Oxford
Free Foresters cricketers
UK MPs 1964–1966
UK MPs 1966–1970
UK MPs 1970–1974
UK MPs 1974
UK MPs 1974–1979
UK MPs 1979–1983
UK MPs 1983–1987
UK MPs 1987–1992
UK MPs 1992–1997
Deputy Lieutenants of West Sussex
Politicians awarded knighthoods